The 2010 Latvian Athletics Championships were held in Jēkabpils, Latvia on July 9–10, 2010.

Men

Women

External links
Results

Latvian Athletics Championships
Latvian Athletics Championships, 2010
Latvian Athletics Championships